is the motto and name of a campaign against right-wing violence in Cologne, Germany. The colloquial slogan in the local dialect Kölsch literally means "Ass up, teeth apart", encouraging people to not look away but to stand up, speak out and take action against racism and injustice.

History

9 November 1992 
This was preceded by a wave of xenophobic attacks, such as the Rostock-Lichtenhagen riots. "" (English: "We […] want to contribute to end the wide-spread speechlessness regarding the developments in our country"), the participating artists wrote in a pre-published statement for the major event. Despite far too lax security measures (nobody had expected the large number of participants), the rally took place without incident.

It was selected for the annual German  in 1993.

For example, it supported the exhibition "" in 2000, which dealt with forced labor in Cologne during Nazi rule.

Among the participating artists and speakers were BAP, Jürgen Becker, Klaus Bednarz, Bläck Fööss, Brings, Charly T., EM:ZEH, Elke Heidenreich, Höhner, Willy Millowitsch, Anke Schweitzer, Triviatas – 1.

20 September 2008 

This movement formed as a reaction to attempts of the politically right party  to organize a gathering of European extreme-right groups in Cologne in a so-called "anti-islamization congress". The State Office for the Protection of the Constitution in NRW classifies Pro Köln as an extreme-right group.

Tens of thousands of people came together in the center of the city for a demonstration to protest right-wing extremism and neo-nazism. Thereby, the planned right-wing gathering could be preempted and eventually prevented from occurring.

9 November 2012 
The 20th anniversary of the original event was held on 9 November 2012 in the form of another rally and concert for social justice. The event took place at the "Deutzer Werft", a spare area between Deutzer Brücke and  alongside the river Rhine. The number of visitors was in the s.

Participating artists and speakers were Özan Akhan, Athena, BAP, Dietmar Bär, Bläck Fööss, Brothers Keepers, Brings, Julius Brink, Tommy Engel, Elke Heidenreich, Höhner, Hop-StopBanda, Carolin Kebekus, Sonia Mikich, Mariele Millowitsch, Wolfgang Niedecken, Walter Pütz, Jonas Reckermann, Jürgen Roters, Peter Rüchel, Frank Schätzing, Wilfried Schmickler, Anke Schweitzer, Viva la Diva, Ranga Yogeshwar, two sign language translators and one hundred fifty "" (members of corps of drums).

Albums 
 Arsch huh, Zäng ussenander (1992) CD
 Arsch huh, Zäng ussenander – live (1992) CD
 Heimatklänge – Zehn Jahre »Arsch huh« (2002) CD
 Arsch huh, Zäng ussenander – Köln stellt sich quer! (2008) CD
 Arsch huh 2012 (2012) CD
 Su läuf dat he (2019)

See also 
 Gentleman (musician)
 Klee (band)
 Birlikte
 Rock gegen Rechts
 Rock Against Racism

References

Further reading
  (192 pages)
 
  (224 pages)

External links 

 
 "", from first "" concert, Cologne, 1992-11-09 [10:44]
 "" from 20th anniversary "" concert, Cologne, 2012-11-09 [7:38]
 
 

Nonviolence
Anti-fascist organisations in Germany
20th century in Cologne
21st century in Cologne
Cultural festivals in Germany
Festivals of multiculturalism
1992 neologisms
Political catchphrases
Music festivals established in 1992
1992 music festivals
2012 music festivals
2016 music festivals
Political terminology in Germany